Groß Rosenburg is a village and a former municipality in the district Salzlandkreis, in Saxony-Anhalt, Germany. Since 1 January 2010, it is part of the town Barby.

Former municipalities in Saxony-Anhalt
Barby, Germany